Texas Blues Man is an album by the blues musician Lightnin' Hopkins, recorded in Texas in late 1967 and released on the Arhoolie label.

Reception

The Penguin Guide to Blues Recordings wrote that the album contains "powerful performances with a resonant electric guitar filling the studio," but that "it was no more than an average Hopkins album."

Track listing
All compositions by Sam "Lightnin'" Hopkins 
 "Tom Moore Blues" – 5:01
 "Watch My Fingers" – 2:48
 "Little Antoinette" – 3:38
 "Love Like a Hydrant" – 3:58
 "Cut Me Out Baby" – 3:27
 "Take a Walk" – 2:37
 "Slavery" – 5:29	
 "I Would If I Could" – 3:19
 "Bud Russell Blues" – 4:32
 "At Home Blues" – 3:07

Personnel

Performance
Lightnin' Hopkins – guitar, vocals

Production
 Chris Strachwitz – producer

References

Lightnin' Hopkins albums
1968 albums
Arhoolie Records albums